Gampaha (Sinhala: ගම්පහ ; Tamil: கம்பஹா ) is an urban city in Gampaha District, Western Province, Sri Lanka. It is situated to the north-east of the capital Colombo. It is the sixth largest urban area in Western Province, after Colombo, Negombo, Kalutara, Panadura and Avissawella. Gampaha is also the second largest municipal centre in Gampaha district, after Negombo.

Namesake
The name "Gampaha" in Sinhala (ගම්පහ) literally means “Five Villages”. The five villages are known to be Ihalagama, Pahalagama, Medagama, Pattiyagama and Aluthgama. However, at present the location of Pattiyagama can no longer be identified within the town limits of Gampaha and remains disputed. Gampaha was also formerly known as Henarathgoda.

History

During reign of Portuguese, the main route to the hill country had been laid through the Gampaha area and in the period of Dutch, this area was served as centre for the collection of cinnamon. But before year 1815, it is said that Gampaha was a dense forest. The 5th Governor of Ceylon, Sir Edward Barnes made a visit to Gampaha in 1825, on the way to observe the construction work of the Negombo-Colombo main road. When British built the “Moragoda” catholic church in 1828, Gampaha and surrounding areas slowly became inhabited.

As the extension of the railway track from Colombo to Ambepussa, the Henarathgoda railway station was completed in 1866 which acted as a key factor for the progress and recognition of the town. In 1867, the first rubber tree of Sri Lanka was planted in Henarathgoda botanical garden.

The town was planned in 1920, with 52 roads including the main street, a water tank, a public market, a hospital and an electrical generator. Most of these are still present in their original sites with various improvements over time.

Local Government
Gampaha was a village council until 1945. On 1 January that year, the town qualified to become an urban council. The first urban council had five members. P. P. Jayawardane was the first chairman of the urban council. Total number of workforce in the urban council was 197 persons. In 1978 constitutional reforms declared Gampaha as a new administrative district (which was formerly recognised as a part of the Colombo District) and the main administrative centre was established in Gampaha. The new district status lead the town to a rapid development, establishing new government institutes. On 16 April 2002, the Urban Council was upgraded to become the Gampaha Municipal Council.

Economy
The economy of Gampaha has been vastly extended in many aspects. Mainly paddy and Rubber are grown here as main cultivation products and additionally pineapple and betel are grown here. Also some rural industries like pottery, tiles, hand loom textiles, coconut related products can be found.

Climate
Gampaha has a tropical rainforest climate under the Köppen climate classification. The climate is fairly temperate all throughout the year with a significant rainfall. Even in the driest month there is a significant amount of rain. The driest month is January and there is about 62 mm of precipitation. Most of the precipitation in Gampaha area falls in October, averaging 365 mm. The precipitation varies 303 mm between the driest month and the wettest month. April is warmest month in Gampaha, with an average temperature of 28.4 °C (83.1 °F) and the December is the coolest month, with temperatures averaging 26.1 °C (79 °F). Throughout the year, temperatures vary by 2.3 °C.

The annual rain fall in the area is about 2398 mm and the average temperature is about 27.3 °C. The main sources of water canals of Gampaha are Attanagalla Oya and Uruwela Oya.

Attractions

 Henarathgoda Botanical Garden where the first rubber tree was planted in Sri Lanka is still present located close to Gampaha town. The garden is bordered with Attangalle oya and covers about 43 acres. It is believed that the garden is more than 128 years old.

The first seedling was planted under the auspices of the vast garden's original owner Muhandiam Amaris De Zoysa, who became the garden's first OIC. The generous Muhandiram donated this vast estate for public use, to enhance the local surroundings.
 Henarathgoda old railway station is one of oldest railway stations in Sri Lanka. It was built in 1866 by the British to facilitate the transportation of tea and coffee from the up country to Colombo.
 Asgiriya Rajamaha Vihara is an ancient Buddhist temple which is located close to the Gampaha town. Currently this temple has been recognized as archaeological protected monument in Minuwangoda division. The history of this temple runs to the reign of King Valagamba.
 Yatawatte Purana Vihara is an old Tampita Vihara, located in Pahalagama. Currently this temple has been protected as one of archaeological protected sites in Sri Lanka.
Wathumulla Ketawala Ambalama is an old Ambalama, located near to Daraluwa rail way station. During the past periods Ambalams were designed to provide shelter for the travelers.
 Ketawala Anicut is one of two anicut projects that come under the key irrigation scheme in Gampaha.
Maligawatta Rajamaha Vihara is an ancient Buddhist Temple which located in Gampaha District. The history of this temple runs to the reign of King Valagamba.  The tooth relic was hidden twice here.
Kaleniya Rajamaha Vihara is an ancient Buddhist Temple in Gampaha District. It is located near to Kelani River.
Gorakaella waterfall

Education
Literacy in Gampaha district is the highest in Sri Lanka. The literacy rate for both sexes is 98.5.
 Gampaha is home to secondary educational institutes in Sri Lanka. The government owned schools in the gampaha area are listed below.

Universities
University of Kelaniya

Schools
Bandaranayake College
Rathnavali Balika Vidyalaya
Anura Central College
Chandrajothi Maha Vidyalaya
Bandarawatta Parakrama Maha Vidyalaya
Bendiyamulla Gajaba Vidyalaya
Bemmulla Gamini Kanishta Vidyalaya
Gothami Kanishta Vidyalaya
Sri Dharmaloka College Kelaniya
Gurukula College Kelaniya
Holy Cross College
Viharamahadevi Balika Vidyalaya Kiribathgoda
Vishaka Balika Vidyalaya Makola
Ihala Yagoda Lumbini Kanishta Vidyalaya
Indigolla Vijitha Prathamika Vidyalaya 
Keppetipola Maha Vidyalaya
Kirindiwela Central College
Kirindiwela Maha Vidyalaya
Kirindiwita Gemunu Kanishta Vidyalaya
Mahaththuwa Jinarathana prathamika Vidyalaya
Mahagamasekaya Maha Vidyalaya 
Moragoda Wimaladharmasuriya Kanishta Vidyalaya 
Sidharthakumara Vidyalaya
Sri Bodhi College
Sumedha College 
St. Peter's College
Thakshila College 
Yasodara Devi Balika Maha Vidyalaya
Gunanodaya Vidyalaya-Divlapitiya

Ayurveda
Pundit Wickramarachchi found the first Ayurveda College of the country - "Sri Lanka Siddhayurveda Vidyalaya" in 1929 closer to Yakkala. "Gampaha Wickramarachchi Ayurveda Vidyalaya (Incorporation) Act No. 30 of 1982" established the college as a national institute for Ayurveda education. From 1 March 1995 the institute was recognized as Gampaha Wickramarachchi Ayurveda Institute and was affiliated to the main university stream of the country Under University of Kelaniya. The institute offers "Bachelor of Ayurveda Medicine and Surgery" (BAMS) diploma and the practitioners are distinguished around the country as "Gampaha Ayurvedic Physicians". Rules for the regulation of the professional conduct of Ayurvedic physicians have been approved by the Minister of Health and gazetted in June 1971.

Transport
Gampaha is the 15th railway station from the Colombo fort on main railway line.

Numerous bus routes terminatate at Gampaha.

References

External links 
 Detailed map of Gampaha and Sri Lanka

 
Populated places in Gampaha District
Populated places in Western Province, Sri Lanka